Melilla requires its residents to register their motor vehicles and display vehicle registration plates. Current plates are European standard 520 mm × 110 mm, and use Spanish stamping dies.

References

Melilla
Transport in Melilla
Melilla-related lists